Ženski nogometni klub Škale, commonly referred to as ŽNK Škale, is a Slovenian women's football club from the city of Velenje.

Formerly known as Rudar Škale, they have won the Slovenian Cup in 2001, 2002, and 2015, and the Slovenian Championship in 2000 and 2002.

Honours
Slovenian League
 Winners (2): 1999–2000, 2001–02Slovenian Cup
 Winners (3): 2000–01, 2001–02, 2014–15

References

Association football clubs established in 1983
Women's football clubs in Slovenia
1983 establishments in Slovenia
Sport in Velenje
Škale